János Tóth can refer to:

 János Tóth (athlete) (born 1978), Hungarian athlete
 János Tóth (politician) (1864-1929), Hungarian politician
 János Tóth (swimmer) (born 1955), Hungarian swimmer